Titu Liviu Maiorescu (15 February 1840 – 18 June 1917) was a Romanian literary critic and politician, founder of the Junimea Society. As a literary critic, he was instrumental in the development of Romanian culture in the second half of the 19th century.

A member of the Conservative Party, he was Foreign Minister between 1910 and 1914 and Prime Minister of Romania from 1912 to 1913. He represented Romania at the Peace Conference in Bucharest that ended the Second Balkan War. In politics as in culture he favoured Germany over France. He opposed Romania's entry in World War I against Germany, but he nevertheless refused to collaborate with the German army after it had occupied Bucharest.

Biography
Titu Liviu Maiorescu was born in Craiova, on 15 February 1840. Maiorescu's mother, born Maria Popazu, was the sister of the scholar and bishop of Caransebeș, Ioan Popazu. The family Popazu came from Vălenii de Munte. His father, Ioan Maiorescu, was the son of a Transylvanian peasant from Bucerdea Grânoasă and his name was actually Trifu, but he adopted the name Maiorescu in order to emphasize his kindship with Petru Maior. Being a theologian by trade (having studied in Blaj, Budapest, Vienna), Ioan Maiorescu proved to be a free thinker. He worked at a teacher in Cernăuți, Craiova, Iași, Bucharest and he remained a bright personality of that epoch of formation for the Romanian modern educational system. Ioan Maiorescu became an inspector for the schools of Oltenia, then he worked as a teacher at the Central School of Craiova. During the Revolution of 1848 he strengthened the link between the Walachian and Transylvanian revolutionaries and he activated as an agent of the Interim Govern, near the German Dieta from Frankfurt. Meanwhile, his family, consisting of his wife, Maria, born Popasu and his two children, Emilia and Titu, travelled to Bucharest, Brașov, Sibiu and Blaj, staying in Brașov for a long while and there, the future critic attended grade fifth at the Romanian gymnasium. Settling in Vienna, Ioan Maiorescu wrote articles in the Austrian newspapers concerning Romanian and Romanians. Returning to Romania after the Union, he became president of the Obșteasca Epitropie (The Public Trusteeship), then he worked as director of the Central Commission of the United Principalities, then he worked as a teacher at the Saint Sava National College, as director of Public Instruction Eforie and then as a teacher at the Superior School of Letters in Bucharest.

Childhood
Between 1846 and 1848 Titu Maiorescu attended the primary school in Craiova. During the days of the revolution, Ioan Maiorescu was sent on a mission to Frankfurt am Main, while Maria Maiorescu and their children travelled to Bucharest, Brașov and Sibiu. In December 1848, under the leadership of Avram Iancu, Ioan Maiorescu's family arrived in Blaj and then in Braşov. Titu Maiorescu continued primary school between 1848 and 1850 at Protodeacon Iosif Barac's School.

Between 1850 and 1851, after finishing primary school, Titu Maiorescu was enlisted at the Romanian Gymnasium from Schei-Braşov, a gymnasium founded in 1850 through his uncle Ioan Popazu's endeavour. He attended grade fifth at the Romanian gymnasium from Brașov and met Anton Pann, who left him an ineffaceable impression.

At Theresianum Academy
In September 1851 the Maiorescu family settled in Vienna, where his father was working within the Ministry of Justice. Later in October Titu Maiorescu attended the first grade at the Academic Gymnasium, which was an addendum of the Theresianum Academy for foreigners. A month later, they equated his results from the gymnasium from Brașov and he passed to the next grade.

While attending the academy in Vienna, Maiorescu a began to write his Însemnărilor zilnice (Daily Journal) (which he kept until July 1917, in 42 notebooks that belong today to the fund of manuscripts from the Romanian Academy Library) and he continued to write his journal until the end of his life. His notes are a good source of knowing Maiorescu's personality. His success from 1858, when he graduated first in his class at the Theresianum Academy, was a guerdon of all his efforts and strong will.

University studies
He was very eager to obtain his university (after only one year of studies in Berlin he obtained his PhD at Giessen, magna cum laude, then after a year, he got his license at the Philology and Philosophy University of Sorbona and one year later, after he studied at the university of Paris, he took his license in law), but his eagerness did not affect his demureness in his studies; the foundations of Maiorescu's extremely solid culture were established during that period.

On 3 January 1857, he sent an essay signed with the name Aureliu to the Transylvania Gazette in order to publish some of his translations from Jean Paul's works. In the following number he intended to publish the translation of a short story written by Jean Paul and entitled "New Year's Eve Night". Although the translation was not published at that date, the letter that Aurel A. Mureşianu edited later in the Gazette of books, no 1, in 1934 is still considered the first publishing attempt of T. Maiorescu and it was republished under the same title. In 1858, beside his academic activity, he worked as a teacher of psychology in private boarding schools and as a French teacher in the house of legal counselor Georg Kremnitz.

As a preparatory for French language for the Kremnitz family, Titu Maiorescu taught the four children of the family: Klara (his future wife), Helene, Wilhelm (future Dr. W. Kremnitz, Mite Kremnitz's husband, born Marie von Bardeleben) and Hermann. Titu Maiorescu got his PhD in philosophy at Giessen, magna cum laude. The Giessen University considered, in order to allow him to get a PhD, that the last two years at Theresianum were university studies. When he returned to Romania, he published the article "The Measure of Height through a Barometer" in the review Isis or Nature.

PhD
In December 1860 he got his license in Philology and Philosophy at Sorbonne due to the acknowledgment of his doctorate from Giessen. The following year, he published his Philosophy essay entitled Philosophical Considerations for Everybody's Understanding in Berlin, obviously under the influence of Herbart's and Feuerbach's ideas. On 17 December, after they considered the value of the essay, and after "a verbal defense in front of the academic committee, brilliantly held for original opinions", the Sorbonne committee granted him the title of "licencé ès lettres" (Philology Licensed). Maiorescu then prepared his doctorate on the thesis: The Relation. Essay on a new foundation of philosophy, until the end of the year 1861, when he left France.

Career as a university teacher

In the summer of 1862 he was assigned as a substitute lawyer at the Law Court, then he became an attorney. He married his pupil, Clara Kremnitz. In November/December, he became a teacher at the University of Iași and principal of the Central Gymnasium from the same town.

In 1863 he was assigned to teach a university course of history, on the subject „About the History of the Roman Republic from the Introduction of Plebeian Tribunes until the Death of Julius Caesar Especially Regarding the Economical and Political Progress”. From February until September he was the Dean of the Philosophy Faculty of the University of Iași. On 18 September 1863 he was elected as rector of the University of Iaşi for a period of four years. In October he was assigned as principal of the School „Vasile Lupu“ from Iași. He taught pedagogy, Romanian Grammar, Psychology and Composition there. For the first time in Romania, he initiated the Pedagogic Practice for pupils and one of these pupils was Ion Creangă.

In 1863 Titu Maiorescu published in Iași the "Yearbook of the Gymnasium and the Boarding School from Iași for the School Year 1862–1863"; the yearbook was preceded by his thesis: „Why Should the Latin Language be Studied in Gymnasium as Part of the Foundation of Moral Education?” On 28 March Titu Maiorescu's daughter, Livia, was born. She later married Dymsza; she died in 1946. On 8 October Titu Maiorescu is elected to lead the Institute Vasilian from Iași, which needed to be „fundamentally reorganized“. In order to complete this mission, commissioned by the Minister of Public Directions from back then, Alexandru Odobescu, he traveled on a documentary journey to Berlin and later he returned to Iași on 4 January 1864.

Between 1863 and 1864 Titu Maiorescu taught philosophy at the Philology University of Iași.

Involvement in social life
On 10 March 1861, Titu Maiorescu held a lecture (Die alte französische Tragödie und die Wagnersche Musik — „The Old French Tragedy and Wagner's Music”) in Berlin for the benefit of the monument of Lessing from Kamenz, which he repeated on 12 April in Paris, at the „Cercle des sociétés savantes“ (Circle of Academic Societies) and later renewed in the form of a communication, on 27 April in Berlin, at the Philosophy Society.

On 28 November he obtained his Law Licence in Paris, on the thesis "Du régime dotal" ("On Dowery Law"). On 10 December he began his lecture cycle on „Education Within the Family”. Afterwards he went back to Romania and settled in Bucharest in December.

When he returned to Romania, at the end of 1861, Titu Maiorescu was eager to contribute to the progress of the recently formed state, after the Union of 1859, of the cultural and political life, of a European level. At that time, when the Union was done and personalities of fresh energies and cultured people were needed, people who were educated in Western Universities, Titu Maiorescu had an early ascent, from his youth, as he was a university professor at 22 years old (in Iași), a dean at 23 and a rector at the same age, then he became an academician (member of the Romanian Academic Society) at 27, a deputy at 30, then a minister at age 34. But this ascent was not always smooth or without hardships, as he was once sued because of all the calumnies that his political opponents promoted and he was suspended from all his functions in 1864, but the verdict of discharge from the following year proved the baselessness of all the accusation against him.

Foundation of the Junimea Society
The years 1860 were for Maiorescu the period of „popular prelections“ (lectures on various problemes addressed to a quite large audience) and also the period when the foundation of the Junimea Society took place. He founded it alongside his friends I. Negruzzi, Petre P. Carp, V. Pogor and Th.Rosetti. He started his work as a lawyer, then he was elected principal of the School „Vasile Lupu“ from Iași, and then he founded the a review Convorbiri Literare in 1867.

Although the period that followed after the Union of 1859 represented an epoch of completion of the ideals of the generation of 1848, a few accents still had changed, the conditions were different from the romantic youth of Heliade Rădulescu, Alecsandri or Bălcescu. Maiorescu was representing the new generation, the junimist generation, which had a new conception on social and Romanian cultural life. On the political ideology plan, Maiorescu was a retentionist, an advocate of a natural, organic and well prepared evolution and an adversary of the „forms without root“, whose indictment he made in his article from 1868, Against nowadays direction in Romanian culture, in which he criticized the implementation of certain institutions which were imitated after the Western ones and to which no appropriate root corresponded in the mentalitaty, creation and cultural legacy of the Romanian people.

Work as a literary critic

The beginnings of Maiorescu's literary critic activity stand apart from the previous generation. Unlike the previous years of the revolution from 1848, when an intense need of original literature determined Heliade Rădulescu to address enthusiastic appeals for Romanian literary works, the seventh decade of the 19th century was marked by a large number of poets and prosemen, who had very limited artistical devices, but high ideals and  pretences. It was a time when the selection of true values was needed, on the basis of certain aesthetic criteria and Maiorescu agreed to accomplish that task. The adversaries of his ideas depreciatively called his action „a judicial criticism“, because his studies and articles did not analyse in detail the literary work that they had discussed and they contain many apothegms on it. These are based on an ample culture, a determined artistic taste and on impressive intuitions. The mentor of Junimea society considered this type of criticism (neatly affirmative or negative) necessary only to that epoch of clutter of values, as its modalities of execution would gradate later, in the literary life, when the great writers would elevate the artistic level and implicitly would have the public's exigency augmented.

This work as a tutor, as fighter for the assertion of values, would be led by Maiorescu throughout his entire life and would be divided between his political activity (he would become prime minister, but he will lose a friend from his youth, P.P. Carp), his University activity (as a professor he had and he promoted disciples of great value, like C. Rădulescu-Motru, P.P. Negulescu, Pompiliu Eliade and others), his lawyer activity and his literary critic activity. Maiorescu was seldom reproached for not having spent enough time on writing literary works but his work as a literary critic profoundly marks one of the most lusty epochs in the history of Romanian literature: the period of the great classics. The role of Junimea society and of Maiorescu himself is linked to the creation and the assertion in the public's conscience of writers like Eminescu, Creangă, Caragiale, Slavici, Duiliu Zamfirescu and others.

Concerning his conduct, the manner that people reproached Maiorescu for his coldness, his lack of passion, his Olympian attitude, that he seemed to hide a dry soul; for exemplifying this statement, the famous appraisal made by the igneous N. Iorga: „Nobody was warm or cold beside him“. The help that Maiorescu gave to the writers from the circle of Junimea and to his disciples and even to his adversary, Dobrogeanu-Gherea, in an important moment of his life, unfolded a man of great and at the same time discreet generosity. The lines that Maiorescu wrote to Eminescu when Eminescu was ill and was worried about the fees for his boarding at the sanatorium from Ober-Döbling prove that Maiorescu was endowed with an admirable gentleness of heart:

„Do you want to know where the means to pay your fees come from for now? Well, mister Eminescu, are we such strangers to each other? Don't you know the love (if you allow me to use this exact word, although it is stronger than other words), the often enthusiastic admiration that I and our entire literary circle feels for you, for your poems, for your whole literary and political work? But it was a real explosion of love that we, all your friends (and only these), contributed to support the few material needs that your situation require. And you would have done the same in using the large or small sum you had when any of your friends would have needed, so we cannot forget a friend of your great value“.

References 

Titu Maiorescu, "Contra școalei Bărnuțiu", "Against Bărnuțiu's School" (1868)

External links
 

1840 births
1917 deaths
People from Craiova
People of the Principality of Wallachia
Conservative Party (Romania, 1880–1918) politicians
Prime Ministers of Romania
Romanian Ministers of Culture
Romanian Ministers of Education
Romanian Ministers of Foreign Affairs
Romanian Ministers of Justice
Romanian Ministers of Public Works
Members of the Chamber of Deputies (Romania)
Members of the Senate of Romania
Romanian people of the Second Balkan War
Romanian people of World War I
Junimists
Romanian Freemasons
Romanian expatriates in France
Romanian expatriates in Germany
Romanian philosophers
Romanian logicians
Romanian art critics
Romanian essayists
Romanian literary critics
Carol I National College alumni
University of Paris alumni
Academic staff of Alexandru Ioan Cuza University
Rectors of Alexandru Ioan Cuza University
Rectors of the University of Bucharest
Founding members of the Romanian Academy
Mihai Eminescu scholars
Burials at Bellu Cemetery
Romanian magazine founders